The Pussycats were a Norwegian rock band from Tromsø. Their members from 1963 to 1967 were bassist and vocalist Sverre Kjelsberg, guitarist and vocalist Trond Graff, drummer Kaare Larsen, lead guitarist Ottar Aasegg, and keyboardist and vocalist Ingemar Stjerndahl. After a few months in Norway, they went out to Stockholm and were discovered by Sten Ekroth. And the year later they recorded their first album, !!Psst !!Psst!! In 1965 they recorded their second and final album with the title !!Mrrr !Mrrr!

Last line-up
Sverre Kjelsberg - bass, vocals (1963–1967)
Trond Graff - guitar, vocals (1964–1967)
Ottar Aasegg - guitar (1963–1967)
Friedel Brandt - drums and percussion (1963–1967)
Ingemar Stjerndahl - keyboards, vocals (1965–1967)

Discography

Albums
Psst|Psst|Psst (1964)
Mrrr..Mrrr....Mrrr... (1965)
Garman (as musicians for Ole Paus) (Karusell, 1972)
Touch Wood (Polydor, 1973)
Psst! Mrr… (MAI, 1981)
The Pussycats Story (Polydor, 1982)
To You (Polydor, 1991)

Singles
"Ebb Tide" (1965)
"Gonna Send You Back to Georgia" (1965)
"Boom Boom"' (1965)
"Let Me Stay with You" (1966)
"Just a Little Teardrop" (1966)
"Why We Have to Wait" (1966)
"Smile at Me" (1966)
"The Craftsman" / "Song" (1967)
"A Night of Life" (1967)
"Vanja-Maria" / "Death Is Coming" (1967)

Norwegian rock music groups
Beat groups
Musical groups established in 1963
1963 establishments in Norway
Musical groups disestablished in 1967
1967 disestablishments in Norway
Musical groups from Tromsø